The Los Alfaques disaster was a tanker explosion that occurred near a holiday campsite on Tuesday July 11, 1978 in Alcanar, Spain. The exploding truck, which was carrying 23-tons of a highly flammable Liquefied petroleum gas called propylene, killed 217 people and severely burned 200 more. Several people from the company that owned the vehicle were prosecuted for criminal negligence. It also resulted in new legislation in Spain making it only legal for vehicles carrying dangerous cargo to transit populated areas at night.

Most of the victims were holiday makers from Germany and other European countries who were staying at the Los Alfaques seaside campground. The site, which is located at km 159 on the N-340 national road is 2 km south of the town of Sant Carles de la Ràpita.

Background 
The truck, which consisted of a Pegaso tractor unit (registered M-7034-C) and a Fruehauf semi-trailer tanker (registered M-7981-R), was owned by Cisternas Reunidas S.A. It was being driven on the day of the explosion by 50-year-old Francisco Imbernón Villena.

Events

Loading and departure
At 10.15am, Villena arrived at the state-owned Enpetrol refinery, located at La Pobla de Mafumet, 9 km north of Tarragona, to be loaded with liquefied propylene for another state-owned company, Paular (now Repsol), in Puertollano. At 12:05pm the fully laden truck left the refinery carrying  of propylene which was more than 4 tons over the maximum design load for the tanker (which 19.35 tons). The tanker drivers were under instructions to take the smaller N-340 national road. instead of the A-7. In the late 1970s, the N-340 was still a narrow and winding coastal road that passed directly through several densely populated urban areas.

Explosion 
By 2:35pm the truck was driving past the Los Alfaques campsite after travelling  from the Enpetrol oil refinery at La Pobla de Mafumet. The time is known because Villena's watch - which was found still attached to his burned wrist - had stopped at 2:36pm. The tightly packed campsite was crowded with nearly 1,000 holidaymakers, many Germans and other foreign tourists, in trailers and tents.

Several different reports from surviving witnesses corroborate roughly the same story, that as the tanker passed the site it was leaking liquefied gas. However, some witnesses thought it was already leaking while others thought they heard a loud bang that preceded the leak starting. The bang might have been caused by a blown tire which caused the truck to swerve and crash into the wall separating the campsite from the roadside (possibly overturning in the process). Within seconds the highly flammable propylene started to rapidly escape from the stopped tanker, it formed a white cloud that partially drifted into the campsite and towards a discothèque to the northeast. Numerous intrigued campers approached the cloud with curiosity as it continued to spread; eventually it became so dense that many were unable to see the tanker. Within moments of the cloud reaching the discothèque, a flash occurred caused by an unknown ignition source. This flash returned to the source instantaneously causing the weakened tanker to explode, igniting its entire load of propylene.

The ensuing blast and fireball destroyed everything – cars, trailers and buildings – within a  radius, charred everything within a  radius, gutting over 90% of the main camping area. The  discothèque to the northeast, which was later determined to be the likely source of the ignition, was also razed, killing all the staff members inside. Additionally, 34 vehicles and 21 tents were burnt out, a restaurant partially collapsed, and the tanker truck was broken into three main pieces.

Emergency response 
The explosion and fireball instantly killed the driver and other people within the area. A total of 157 people died on site as a result of the initial explosion and the subsequent fires and explosions of cars and gas cylinders used by the tourists. Victims were seen with their hair and clothing on fire, fleeing into the sea in an attempt to put out the flames.

In the first 45 minutes after the disaster, the wounded were removed in an uncoordinated fashion with the help of other survivors using their own cars and vans. Locals also provided help and took the wounded to the hospitals. Ambulances and other emergency forces gradually arrived. The Civil Guard and the armed forces searched the devastated camp for survivors. It took three hours until the last of the wounded were removed and taken to hospital.

The burning tanker blocked the road, dividing the injured into two groups, one being taken northwards and the other southwards. On the road to the north, the injured received adequate medical care, once they had reached either the hospitals at Amposta or at Tortosa. At this stage, the final destination of 58 severely burned patients was the Francisco Franco Hospital in Barcelona. Eighty-two severely burned patients were taken south to the La Fe Hospital in Valencia. In most cases no medical steps of any importance were taken during the journey. Several of the injured developed severe shock on the journey and had no measurable blood pressure on arrival. Many of the patients had burns covering more than 90% of their bodies, and most of them died during the following days. Contributing to the high mortality figure was the inappropriate medical care given en route to the hospital.

In the week following the disaster, the patients from France, Germany, Belgium and the Netherlands were evacuated to their own countries.

Victims
More than 300 people were wounded, some of them severely. Initially 217 people died directly from the explosion (four Spaniards including the driver, all the others were foreigner nationals) while the total number of people who died in the following months as a result of their injuries rose to at least 270. The official figure for the number of victims is 215.

Many of the victims were burned beyond recognition. Identification was difficult, as most of them were wearing only swimming suits, and the administration building where their documents were stored was destroyed in the explosion. There was no DNA test available at that time. As a result of the work done by the forensic teams from the tourists' home countries, all victims were eventually identified.

Seven of the victims remained unidentified until some time later, and they were interred at the cemetery of Tortosa, Tarragona. The bodies of a French family, consisting of a couple and their two children, were returned to France some years later, after compensation had been settled. The bodies of another family of three originating from Colombia were never sent home, and they remain the only foreigners to be interred at the cemetery of Tortosa along with local victims.

Inquiry 
Following the accident, Cisternas Reunidas accepted responsibility for the disaster, but denied any order or prohibition to the drivers to use the motorway instead of the national road, claiming that it was the driver who chose which road to take. Later, some workers at the Tarragona plant stated they heard Imbernón heatedly arguing with someone on the phone and demanding money for the motorway toll.
Enpetrol initially declined any responsibility, claiming that the delivery of the cargo was the carrier's responsibility, and they had not received any complaint.

The official inquiry determined that the truck had been severely overloaded, and also lacked emergency pressure release valves, which are designed to help prevent a boiling liquid expanding vapor explosion (BLEVE) in case of a fire. However, these valves were no longer mandatory in 1978 as they previously had been. The truck was due for an inspection check-over in 1980, and it had passed the previous inspection.

The tank container was manufactured on 13 December 1973 by a workshop from Bilbao, and at that time it did not meet the requirements for carrying flammable liquids, since it lacked emergency pressure release valves. Therefore, the tank had been used to carry other substances, some of which were highly corrosive. Tests on the remnants of the steel tank revealed microscopic stress cracks consistent with corrosion caused by previous loads of improperly overpressurized anhydrous ammonia. Combined with whether the tanker suffered an impact that caused additional structural damage, these factors likely led to the almost instantaneous rupture of the tank when the flames flashed back into the tanker. Even without safety valves, a structurally sound and properly filled tanker should have been able to maintain structural integrity in a fire long enough to at least allow nearby people to escape.

The inquiry also revealed that overloading of tankers was common practice at Enpetrol refineries. The Tarragona facility lacked either a meter to measure the amount of gas dispensed or an automatic shut-off device to prevent overfilling, and consequently most tanks were consistently overloaded. The driver was neither informed of the overloading, nor about the type and class of the cargo, and there was no means for him to check the pressure level of the tank before he departed or to monitor it in transit. He had not attended the hazmat training program for drivers of dangerous goods, because the company considered his experience of twenty years as a truck driver to be sufficient. The inquiry also determined that, between 3 January and 7 July that year, 32 tanks left the Tarragona refinery overloaded, with drivers other than Imbernón.

Legacy 

After the tragedy, the transit of populated areas by vehicles carrying dangerous cargo was prohibited in Spain, and would only be driven at night.

In 1982, four employees of ENPETROL and two of Cisternas Reunidas were convicted of criminal negligence, and were sentenced to prison for between one and four years. Later, four of them were released after appealing the Court's decision, and all prison sentences were suspended or reduced. The two companies paid an equivalent of €13.23 million (not allowing for inflation) as compensation to the victims.

Six months after the tragedy, the completely renovated campsite was reopened to tourists and Los Alfaques continued in operation.

In 2012 the owners of the still-operating Los Alfaques campsite sought relief through Spanish courts under the newly approved "Right to Be Forgotten" Act passed by Spain, arguing that Google's search results were unfairly weighted towards the 1978 disaster and was driving away their business. The campsite owners protested that even 30 years after the disaster, the top 12 Google search results for "Los Alfaques" still focused on the 1978 tragedy, including many gruesome thumbnails of burnt human remains, stacked caskets and coroner procedures during cleanup of the campground. The trial was dismissed, with the plaintiffs being informed that they would need to pursue a U.S. lawsuit against Google.

In popular culture 
The accident is featured in the 2007 German film Day of Disaster, directed by Peter Keglevic. However, the film is loosely based on real facts, and contains blunders and factual errors, such as cars or registration plates which could only have appeared years later, or the driver spending the night before at home with the already (over)loaded tanker parked in front of his house.

See also 
 List of transportation fires

Notes

References
 The Czech magazine "Svět motorů" (The World of Motors) No.36/1978
 Hymes, Boydell, Prescott, & The Institution of Chemical Engineers (Great Britain). Thermal Radiation 2: Physiological and Pathological Effects. IChemE Pub, 1996. Appx. 5, Case Hist. 1, pp. 97–110.

External links 
 Article about the accident, including photos of the truck remnants (in Spanish)
 An article about the accident in "El Pais" (in Spanish)
 An article about the trial in "El Pais" (in Spanish)
 Los Alfaques campsite web page
 A collection of articles about Los Alfaques disaster (in Spanish)
 Scan of article from Czech magazine Svět Motorů No. 36/1978
 

1978 crimes in Spain
1978 in Spain
1978 road incidents
Chemical disasters
Crime in Spain
Man-made disasters in Spain
Explosions in 1978
Explosions in Spain
Fires in Spain
Gas explosions
Road incidents in Spain
July 1978 events in Europe
Transport disasters in 1978
Building collapses in Europe
Building collapses caused by fire
1978 disasters in Spain